The XIX 2014 Pan Am Badminton Championships were held in Markham, Canada, between October 13 and October 19, 2014.

This event was part of the 2014 BWF Grand Prix Gold and Grand Prix series of the Badminton World Federation.

Venue
Markham Pan Am Centre, within the Greater Toronto Area of Ontario, Canada.

Medalists

References

 * BWF Tournament Calendar 2014

External links
Official website
TournamentSoftware.com: Individual Results
TournamentSoftware.com: Team Results

Pan Am Badminton Championships
Pan Am Badminton Championships
Pan Am Badminton Championships
Pan Am Badminton Championships
Badminton tournaments in Canada
Sport in Markham, Ontario
International sports competitions in Toronto